State Route 12 (SR 12) is a generally northeast-southwest route in Ohio.  Its western terminus is at SR 115 and SR 189 in Vaughnsville, and its eastern terminus is at SR 53 just south of Fremont.

Route description
From Vaughnsville, SR 12 travels northeast through the small towns of Columbus Grove, Pandora, and Benton Ridge before entering Findlay.  Through Findlay, it shortly shares a route with US 224.  After exiting Findlay, it continues on a northeast heading, passing through Arcadia, Fostoria, and Bettsville before ending at SR 53.

History
State Route 12's original routing in 1923 had it end in Findlay at its western terminus, and its eastern terminus extended from Fremont on U.S. Route 6's current route, going through Sandusky before ending in Cleveland.

In 1926, its eastern terminus was moved into Sandusky; its route to Cleveland was replaced with State Route 2.

When U.S. Route 6 was certified in 1932, State Route 12 was rerouted through the town of Castalia, ending in Sandusky.  On this route, State Route 12 shared a route with State Route 101 from Castalia to Sandusky.

In 1938, State Route 12's western terminus was moved to U.S. Route 30N near Delphos, replacing the remaining section of State Route 106. This terminus was moved to Vaughnsville in 1971, when U.S. Route 30N (the modern routing of U.S. Route 30) moved off the Lincoln Highway.

In 1969, State Route 12's eastern terminus was moved to its current terminus.  The section of road between Fremont and State Route 101 that was formerly State Route 12 was recertified as State Route 412.

Major junctions

Truck Route 12
SR 12 has a corresponding special route, Truck Route 12, that bypasses Findlay.  The  truck route begins at State Route 12's interchange with Interstate 75 on the west side of Findlay. It heads north on I-75 to its interchange with Hancock County Road 99, where it exits and moves east along that road, CR 212, and Bright Road.  It then moves south along Bright Road to reconnect with SR 12 on the east side of Findlay.

References

External links

012
Transportation in Putnam County, Ohio
Transportation in Allen County, Ohio
Transportation in Hancock County, Ohio
Transportation in Seneca County, Ohio
Transportation in Sandusky County, Ohio